John L. Casti (born 1943) is an author, mathematician and entrepreneur.

Author
Casti has written more than 120 scientific articles, seven technical monographs and textbooks on Mathematical modeling. He was also the former editor of the journals Applied Mathematics & Computation (Elsevier, New York) and Complexity (Wiley, New York). In 1989 his text/reference works Alternate Realities: Mathematical Models of Nature and Man (Wiley, 1989) was awarded a prize by the "Association of American Publishers" in a competition among all scholarly books published in Mathematics and the natural ciences. In 1992, he also published Reality Rules (Wiley, New York), a two-volume text on mathematical modeling. He has written fourteen popular books on science. These include Paradigms Lost: Images of Man in the Mirror of Science (Morrow, NY, 1989), which addresses several of the most puzzling controversies in modern science, Searching for Certainty: What Scientists Can Know About the Future (Morrow, NY, 1991), a volume dealing with problems of scientific prediction and explanation of everyday events like the weather, stock market price movements and the outbreak of warfare, and Complexification (HarperCollins, NY, 1994), a study of complex systems and the manner in which they give rise to counterintuitive, surprising behavior. Dr. Casti has also written three popular volumes on mathematics: Five Golden Rules: Great Theories of 20th-Century Mathematics---and Why They Matter; a sequel, Five More Golden Rules (1995, 2000) both published by John Wiley & Sons (New York); and Mathematical Mountaintops: The Five Most Famous Problems of All Time, published and later recalled by Oxford University Press (New York). In addition, in 1996 he published Would-Be Worlds, a volume on computer simulation and the way it promises to change the way we do science, also published by John Wiley & Sons (New York). In 1998 he published a volume of scientific fiction, involving Ludwig Wittgenstein, Alan Turing, J. B. S. Haldane, C. P. Snow and Erwin Schrödinger in a fictional dinner-party conversation centered about the question of the uniqueness of human cognition and the possibility of thinking machines. This book was published under the title "The Cambridge Quintet" by Little, Brown.(London) in December 1997 and by Addison-Wesley in the US in early 1998. More recently, his published books include Art & Complexity (Elsevier, Amsterdam, 2005), a volume edited with A. Karlqvist, as well as a short volume on the life of the Austrian logician, Kurt Gödel, the book Gödel: A Life of Logic (Perseus Books, Cambridge, MA, 2003). In the same year he published the volume, The One, True, Platonic Heaven (Joseph Henry Press, Washington, DC, 2003), which addresses in a fictional format the question of the limits to scientific knowledge. The volume on art and complexity sparked off a continuing interest in the interrelationship between complex systems and artistic forms of all types, which is reflected in a set of papers currently in preparation addressing the complexity of scientific theories regarded as artistic forms. Recently, Casti turned his attention to writing fiction. He has recently written a neo-noir thriller entitled Prey for Me.

Mathematician
As a mathematician and researcher, Casti received his Ph.D. under Richard Bellman at the University of Southern California. He worked at the RAND Corporation in Santa Monica, California, and served on the faculties of the University of Arizona, New York University and Princeton University, before moving to Vienna in 1973 to become one of the first members of the research staff at the International Institute for Applied Systems Analysis (IIASA) in Laxenburg, Austria. In 1986, he left IIASA to take up a position as a professor of operations research and system theory at the Technical University of Vienna. He also served as a member of the External Faculty of the Santa Fe Institute in Santa Fe, New Mexico, USA, from 1992–2002, where he worked extensively on the application of biological metaphors to the mathematical modeling of problems in economics, finance and road-traffic networks, as well as on large-scale computer simulations for the study of such networks.

His primary research interests have shifted somewhat in recent years from the natural sciences to the exploration of questions in the social and behavioral realm. One thread has been exploration of the relationship between the social "mood" of a population and its biasing effect on actions and behaviors. In this direction, his 2010 book, Mood Matters: From Rising Skirt Lengths to the Collapse of World Powers, addresses the directions and patterns of social causation and their implications for future trends and collective social events, such as styles in popular culture, the outcome of political processes, and even the rise and fall of civilizations. His most recent book is X-EVENTS: The Collapse of Everything, which addresses the underlying cause of extreme events generated by human inattention, misunderstanding, error, stupidity, or malevolent intent.

Entrepreneur

Casti formed two companies in Santa Fe and London in 2000, Qforma, Inc. and SimWorld, Ltd, respectively, devoted to the employment of tools and concepts from modern system theory for the solution of problems in business and finance, as well as health care. Qforma merged with SkilaMederi in June 2013. In early 2005 he returned to Vienna, where he co-founded The Kenos Circle, a professional society that aims to make use of complexity science in order to gain a deeper insight into the future than that offered by more conventional statistical tools.

For several years, Professor Casti was a Senior Research Scholar at the International Institute for Applied Systems Analysis in Laxenburg, Austria, where he created an initiative for the study on Extreme Events in Human Society. In January 2012 he left IIASA to form a new research institute in Vienna, The X-Center, devoted to the study of human-caused extreme events. The X-Center has now expanded to a network of affiliated X-Centers in Helsinki, Tokyo, Seoul, New York and Singapore. Since early 2013, Dr. Casti has been serving as a senior research fellow at the Center for Complex Systems and Enterprises at the Stevens Institute of Technology in the USA. Casti co-founded X-Events Dynamics LLC in 2017 to focus on extreme events in business and government.

Accusations of plagiarism
In 2002, Casti's newest book, Mathematical Mountaintops, was recalled by Oxford University Press due to "rampant plagiarism." According to the New York Times, in the book, Casti had "lifted" passages and images from mathematicians and writers such as Thomas Callister Hales, William Dunham, Barry Arthur Cipra, and Simon Singh

In another incident two years later, Casti retracted one of his articles, "Losing games for your winning play," that had been published in the journal Complexity. In the retraction notice, Casti admitted that it had been "... plagiarized in its entirety from the article by Erica Klarreich, 'Playing Both Sides' in the January/February issue of The Sciences." Casti apologized to Klarreich, as well as to Paul Davies, for plagiarizing their work.

Bibliography

 
 
 
 
 
 
 
 
 
 
 
 
 
 
 
 
 
 
 
  (Withdrawn for plagiarism, 2002.)

References

Living people
20th-century American mathematicians
21st-century American mathematicians
Writers from Santa Fe, New Mexico
Mathematicians from Vienna
University of Southern California alumni
1943 births
American male writers
People involved in plagiarism controversies
Santa Fe Institute people
American expatriates in Austria